Lochwinnoch railway station is a railway station serving the village of Lochwinnoch, Renfrewshire, Scotland. The station is managed by ScotRail and is on the Ayrshire Coast Line.

History 
The station was opened on 12 August 1840 by the Glasgow, Paisley, Kilmarnock and Ayr Railway. Upon the opening of the new Lochwinnoch station on the Dalry and North Johnstone Line, the station was renamed Lochside on 1 June 1905. The station closed on 4 July 1955; however, it reopened on 27 June 1966 when the newer station closed. Lochside station was renamed back to Lochwinnoch on 13 May 1985 during the electrification of the line by British Rail.

Services
The evening (to Ardrossan Harbour) & Sunday (to Largs) service is hourly each way.

References

Notes

Sources

External links
Video and commentary on Lochwinnoch Railway Station

Railway stations in Renfrewshire
Railway stations in Great Britain opened in 1840
Railway stations in Great Britain closed in 1955
Railway stations in Great Britain opened in 1966
Reopened railway stations in Great Britain
SPT railway stations
Railway stations served by ScotRail
Former Glasgow and South Western Railway stations